Sun Valley is a resort village in the Canadian province of Saskatchewan within Census Division No. 7. It is on the shores of Buffalo Pound Lake in the Rural Municipality of Marquis No. 191. It is south of the Resort Village of South Lake.

History 
Sun Valley incorporated as a resort village on January 1, 1985.

Demographics 

Government 
The Resort Village of Sun Valley is governed by an elected municipal council and an appointed administrator. The mayor is Shannon Pearce and its administrator is Melinda Huebner.

See also 
List of communities in Saskatchewan
List of municipalities in Saskatchewan
List of resort villages in Saskatchewan
List of villages in Saskatchewan
List of summer villages in Alberta

References 

Resort villages in Saskatchewan
Marquis No. 191, Saskatchewan
Division No. 7, Saskatchewan